Eaglesfield may refer to the following places in the United Kingdom:

Eaglesfield, Cumbria, hamlet in England
Eaglesfield, Dumfries and Galloway, village in Scotland